Karol Szymański (born 25 June 1993) is a Polish professional footballer who plays as a goalkeeper for Piast Gliwice.

Club career
On 28 July 2020, he signed with Piast Gliwice.

References

External links

1993 births
People from Szczecinek
Sportspeople from West Pomeranian Voivodeship
Living people
Polish footballers
Association football goalkeepers
Gwardia Koszalin players
Jarota Jarocin players
Chojniczanka Chojnice players
Chrobry Głogów players
Kotwica Kołobrzeg footballers
Polonia Środa Wielkopolska players
Lech Poznań players
Lech Poznań II players
Piast Gliwice players
Ekstraklasa players
I liga players
II liga players
III liga players